Robbie Smith (born 26 September 1998) is a Scottish rugby union player who is a Stage 3 Scottish Rugby Academy player assigned to Northampton Saints. His usual position is hooker.

Amateur career

He started playing rugby with Newton Stewart before then playing with Ayr.

He was assigned Ayr in the Pro draft for the Scottish Premiership sides from Glasgow Warriors for the season 2017-18.

Smith has played for Scotland U16, U18 and U20 teams.

Professional career

Smith is enrolled in the BT Sport Scottish Rugby Academy as a Stage 3 player. Stage 3 players are aligned to a professional club and given regional support.

Smith made his Glasgow Warriors debut in the Pro14 match against Ospreys at Scotstoun Stadium on 25 January 2019. The Warriors won the match 9-3.

On 3 May 2019, Smith signed his first professional contract with Bedford Blues in the English RFU Championship for the 2019-20 season. On 23 September 2020, Smith moves to the Premiership Rugby with Newcastle Falcons from the 2020-21 season.

External links 

 
 Scotland U20 player profile

References 

1998 births
Living people
Scottish rugby union players
Glasgow Warriors players
Ayr RFC players
Rugby union players from Dumfries
Newton Stewart RFC players
Rugby union hookers